Vangueria coerulea is a species of flowering plant in the family Rubiaceae. It is endemic to Eswatini and the former Transvaal Province.

External links 
 World Checklist of Rubiaceae

Flora of Swaziland
coerulea